Iurii Semeniuk (born 12 May 1994) is a Ukrainian professional volleyball player, a member of the Ukraine national team. At the professional club level, he plays for Projekt Warsaw.

Honours

Clubs
 National championships
 2018/2019  Ukrainian SuperCup, with Barkom-Kazhany
 2018/2019  Ukrainian Cup, with Barkom-Kazhany
 2018/2019  Ukrainian Championship, with Barkom-Kazhany
 2020/2021  Ukrainian SuperCup, with Barkom-Kazhany
 2020/2021  Ukrainian Cup, with Barkom-Kazhany
 2020/2021  Ukrainian Championship, with Barkom-Kazhany
 2021/2022  Ukrainian Championship, with Epicentr-Podolyany

Individual awards
 2019: Ukrainian Championship – Best Middle Blocker 
 2020: Belgian Championship – Best Spiker

External links
 
 Player profile at PlusLiga.pl   
 Player profile at Volleybox.net

1993 births
Living people
Sportspeople from Lviv Oblast
Ukrainian men's volleyball players
European Games competitors for Ukraine
Ukrainian expatriate sportspeople in Belgium
Expatriate volleyball players in Belgium
VC Barkom-Kazhany players
Greenyard Maaseik players
Projekt Warsaw players
Middle blockers
21st-century Ukrainian people